Anolis johnmeyeri, Meyer's anole, is a species of lizard in the family Dactyloidae. The species is found in Honduras.

References

Anoles
Endemic fauna of Honduras
Reptiles of Honduras
Reptiles described in 1982
Taxa named by James Randall McCranie